Pinay is a commune in the Loire department in central France.

Population

See also
Communes of the Loire department

References

Communes of Loire (department)